"Get Up!" is a song written and recorded by Korn, featuring the production of American producer Skrillex that appears on their tenth studio album, The Path of Totality. It was released as the album's lead single on May 6, 2011. Since its release, it has sold over 500,000 downloads in the United States. It was debuted live at Coachella with Skrillex. The song is also included on Roadrunner Record's XXX: Three Decades of Roadrunner box set on disc four.

Music video
The music video, directed by Sébastian Paquet and Joshua Allen, shows Korn performing the song to their fans. It shows different footage; switching between Korn, fans, backstage, and the band's additional live musicians. It was officially released by Roadrunner on September 27, 2011. A lyric video was also created for the song which garnered over six million views on YouTube and more than 50,000 likes.

Charts

Certifications

References

Korn songs
2011 singles
Song recordings produced by Skrillex
Roadrunner Records singles
Skrillex songs
Songs written by Jonathan Davis
Songs written by James Shaffer
Songs written by Skrillex
2011 songs
Dubstep songs